Tuvaruhu is a suburb of Honiara, Solomon Islands, south of Point Cruz.

References

Populated places in Guadalcanal Province
Suburbs of Honiara